Collaria elegans is a species of slime mold in the family Lamprodermataceae.

References

External links
 
 Collaria elegans at Index Fungorum

Myxogastria
Species described in 1982